Aigusta Anastasia of Lithuania (c. 1320–1345) was a Grand Princess consort of Muscovy. Most likely she was the daughter of Gediminas, Grand Duke of Lithuania, and wife of Simeon, Grand Prince of Moscow.

There is no direct evidence that she was a daughter of Gediminas, but because of her high-profile marriage, most historians have concluded that she was a member of Gediminas' family. She was born probably between 1316 and 1321.

Aigusta was baptized as Anastasia in order to marry Simeon of Russia in November or December 1333; he became Grand Prince of Moscow in 1341. The marriage had great potential because Lithuania and Moscow were fierce rivals for supremacy in Ruthenia, but conflicts broke out again in 1335, just two years after the marriage.

Her two sons Vasilei and Konstantin did not survive infancy; her daughter Vasilisa in 1350 married Mikhail Vasilevich of Kashin, a Tverite prince opposing Lithuania. Her brother Jaunutis sought her help when he was deposed by Algirdas in 1345. Immediately before her death on March 11, 1345, Augusta became a nun. She was buried within the Moscow Kremlin at a monastic church whose construction she had sponsored.

References

1320 births
1345 deaths
Russian royal consorts
14th-century Russian women
Gediminids